Youn Kun-young (26 September 1969), also known as Yun Kun-young, is a South Korean politician representing Guro District of Seoul at the National Assembly starting from 2020. He previously served as state affairs secretary to President Moon Jae-in.

Minister of SMEs and Startups Park Young-sun, who served as Guro District B constituency representative since 2008, announced she will not seek for re-election. He then resigned from post at the Office of the President in January 2020. As many suspected, He ran for Park's constituency in the 2020 general election.

Youn holds two degrees from Kookmin University - a bachelor's in commerce and a master's in economics.

Electoral history

References 

 
Living people
1969 births
South Korean government officials
Minjoo Party of Korea politicians
Members of the National Assembly (South Korea)
People from Busan
Kookmin University alumni